The Hobbit (full title The Fabulous Journey of Mr. Bilbo Baggins, The Hobbit, Across the Wild Land, Through the Dark Forest, Beyond the Misty Mountains. There and Back Again) is a 1985 Soviet television play, being a loose adaption of J. R. R. Tolkien's 1937 book The Hobbit by Vladimir Latyshev.

The play featured Zinovy Gerdt as "the professor" (a narrator stand-in for Tolkien),  as Bilbo Baggins, Anatoly Ravikovich as Thorin Oakenshield and Igor Dmitriev as Gollum. Smaug and the Mirkwood spiders were portrayed by puppets. Missing in this version are the trolls, Elrond, Beorn and the wood-elves. The goblins are human-like with little makeup, and were portrayed by dancers from the Leningrad State Academic Opera and Ballet Theatre, as are the inhabitants of Lake Town.

The play was shot in 1984 as a teleplay and produced in the framework of the children's TV series Tale after Tale aired at the Leningrad TV Channel in the 1980s and the 1990s. It has also appeared on DVD, although the TV and DVD versions each contain material that the other does not. No subtitles were included, but fan-made subtitles have since appeared.

Cast
 Zinovy Gerdt – narrator (J. R. R. Tolkien)
  – Bilbo Baggins
 Ivan Krasko – Gandalf
 Igor Dmitriev – Gollum
 Anatoly Ravikovich – Thorin Oakenshield
  – Kíli
 Mikhail Kuznetsov – Fíli
  – Balin
 Nikolai Gavrilov – Dwalin
 Kirill Dateshidze – Dori
 Vladimir Kozlov – Nori
  – Ori
 Yuri Zatravkin – Glóin
 Vladimir Lelyotko – Óin
 Mikhail Khrabrov – Bofur
 Yuri Ovsyanko – Bifur
 Alexander Isakov – Bombur
  – Bard the Bowman
  – dragon Smaug
 Vladimir Martianov – spider (voice)
 Igor Muravyov – spider (voice)
  – leader of the goblins
 Leonard Sekirin – goblin
 Alexander Slanksnis – goblin

Versions 
The film exists in at least two official versions, in each of which there are episodes that appear only in that version. The timing of the versions differs by 50 seconds.

See also 

Adaptations of The Hobbit
 Khraniteli

References

External links 
 

Films based on The Hobbit
Soviet television films
1985 television films
1985 films
1980s children's fantasy films
Films about dragons
1980s British films